There were one female athlete and two male athletes representing Ecuador at the 2000 Summer Paralympics.

See also
2000 Summer Paralympics

References

Bibliography

External links
International Paralympic Committee

Nations at the 2000 Summer Paralympics
Paralympics
2000